Federal Route 139 is a federal road in Melaka, Malaysia. This route was known as Melaka State Route M8 on Masjid Tanah–Lendu–Alor Gajah side before it was recommissioned as a federal road. The Kilometre Zero of the Federal Route 139 starts at Masjid Tanah.

Features
At most sections, the Federal Route 139 was built under the JKR R5 road standard, allowing maximum speed limit of up to 90 km/h.

List of junctions

References

139